Nigeremys ("Niger turtle") is an extinct genus of bothremydid pleurodiran turtle from Niger, Mali and Syria. The genus consists exclusively of type species N. gigantea.

Discovery 
Nigeremys was described in 1977.

References 

Bothremydidae
Prehistoric turtle genera
Late Cretaceous turtles
Paleocene turtles
Eocene turtles
Maastrichtian life
Cretaceous–Paleogene boundary
Fossils of Mali
Fossils of Niger
Fossils of Syria
Fossil taxa described in 1890
Monotypic turtle genera